Horacio Marcelo Elizondo (born November 4, 1963 in Don Bosco, district of Quilmes) is an Argentine former international football referee best known for his officiation throughout the 2006 FIFA World Cup. Having achieved all his goals in refereeing, Elizondo retired after the December 2006 match between Boca Juniors and Lanús, 2 years before the compulsory retirement age of 45.

Career

Elizondo completed studies in physical education, and started refereeing after finishing the AFA course. His debut in the Argentine first division was in the Deportivo Español vs. Belgrano de Córdoba match in 1992. He was named international in 1994, and directed his first international match on October 9, 1996 between Ecuador and Colombia for the 1998 World Cup qualifications.

Among the several international competitions in which he participated are the Copa América of 1997 and 1999), the U-17 World Cup of 1997 and 2005, the U-20 World Youth Championships of 2003 and 2005, the Olympic Games of 2004, and the FIFA Club World Championship of 2000. In the latter, he showed a red card to David Beckham in the tie between Manchester United and Necaxa.

He also refereed in the final matches of the 2002 and 2005 Copa Libertadores de América. In the 2005 tournament the two Brazilian finalist teams São Paulo FC and Atlético Paranaense lobbied Conmebol to have Elizondo as the main referee.

On August 16, 2006 Elizondo refereed the second final of the 2006 Copa Libertadores.

Elizondo broke the Argentine First Division record showing 12 yellow cards on August 19 in the match between Boca Juniors and Independiente. The media, though, supported most of his decisions.

In the annual world referee ranking of the International Federation of Football History and Statistics (IFFHS), Elizondo was positioned 5th in 2001, 12th in 2005 and 1st in 2006.

2006 FIFA World Cup
Elizondo was appointed to represent Argentina in the 2006 FIFA World Cup, together with fellow assistants Darío García and Rodolfo Otero. He officiated three group games: Germany vs Costa Rica, Czech Republic vs Ghana, and Switzerland vs South Korea. He also took charge of the England vs Portugal quarterfinal, as well as the final game between Italy and France, becoming the first referee in World Cup history to referee both the opening and final games of one World Cup, a feat later matched by compatriot Néstor Pitana in the 2018 edition (English referee George Reader also officiated the first and last matches of the 1950 FIFA World Cup in Brazil, but the last one, known as Maracanazo, was not technically a final). Elizondo handed out a total of 29 cards in the tournament, three of which were red, for an average of 5.8 cards per game.

Elizondo took charge of the opening game of the tournament between Germany and Costa Rica, which Germany won 4-2.  Elizondo handed out one yellow card to Costa Rica’s Danny Fonseca. The match had a total of 22 fouls and 6 offsides, both statistics split evenly between the two teams. FIFA's president of the World cup organizing committee Lennart Johansson praised Elizondo performance at the match, saying "I did not notice him much which is a very good thing."

In his following match in the  group stage, which Ghana won 2-0 against Czech Republic, he gave a straight red card to Czech player Tomáš Ujfaluši for a professional foul in the box, awarding a penalty to Ghana.  He then gave a yellow card to Asamoah Gyan when he took the penalty kick prematurely. Gyan missed his second attempt. Elizondo also booked Czech player Vratislav Lokvenc and Ghanaian players Otto Addo, Michael Essien, Derek Boateng and Sulley Muntari, for a total of seven cards.  He called 12 fouls against the Czech Republic and 20 against Ghana.  He further ruled the Czechs offside 6 times and Ghanaians 9 times.

Elizondo was also the referee in the Switzerland 2-0 South Korea group game.  Elizondo handed out nine yellow cards during the match, booking five Swiss players, Philippe Senderos, Hakan Yakın, Raphael Wicky, Christoph Spycher and Johan Djourou and four Koreans Park Chu-Young, Kim Jin-Kyu, Choi Jin-Cheul and Lee Chun-Soo.  Elizondo called 7 fouls against Switzerland and 19 against South Korea.  There were a total of six offsides calls, split evenly between the two teams.

He awarded the Swiss a goal when he overruled the assistant referee Rodolfo Otero's raised offside flag. Several players, including two defenders, Kim Jin-Kyu and Choi Jin-Cheul, who were following Alexander Frei stopped playing when they saw the flag. The ball was put into the path of Alexander Frei after being hit by Lee Ho's foot. Korea's coach Dick Advocaat was livid at the time, but a few days later agreed that the decision to allow the goal was correct.

Elizondo was the referee in the England 0-0 Portugal quarter-final, which Portugal won 3-1 on penalties. Elizondo gave yellow cards to Ricardo Carvalho and Petit of Portugal and to Owen Hargreaves and John Terry of England, as well as a straight red card to England's Wayne Rooney after he stood on Ricardo Carvalho's groin, for a total of 5 cards. Elizondo called 18 fouls on England and 10 on Portugal, found Portugal offsides 3 times and England none.

World Cup Final
Elizondo was the referee for the final of the tournament in Berlin's Olympiastadion on July 9, between France and Italy. He awarded France a penalty after Florent Malouda went down in the box under contact from Marco Materazzi. Elizondo gave Zinedine Zidane a red card after he headbutted in the chest Marco Materazzi  in the 111th minute after consulting fourth official Luis Medina Cantalejo via headset.

Statistics

References

External links
FIFAworldcup.com profile

 Horacio Elizondo

1963 births
Living people
Argentine football referees
People from Quilmes
Argentine people of Basque descent
FIFA World Cup referees
2006 FIFA World Cup referees
FIFA World Cup Final match officials
Copa América referees
Sportspeople from Buenos Aires Province